Auschnippe (German for 'cut out') is a river of Lower Saxony, Germany. It flows on the west side of Adelebsen before following through Dransfeld and then into the Schwülme.

See also
List of rivers of Lower Saxony

References

Rivers of Lower Saxony
Rivers of Germany